Forest Lawn Memorial Park,  is a cemetery is located at 3227 Dixie Highway in Erlanger, Kentucky.

Background
In 1935, Marguerite Stetter, of Bellevue, Kentucky purchased the old Tom Cody Estate on the Dixie Highway for use as a cemetery. In January 1937, the first burial took place at Forest Lawn. The absence of large grave markers and monuments made Forest Lawn unique in the 1930s. The cemetery was built as a "garden." Grave markers were to remain small and flush with the ground, thus, maintaining a rural garden atmosphere. The cemetery has become one of the largest in Northern Kentucky.

Burials
Some of the more famous burials include Congressman Judson Lincoln Newhall, Country-Western star Kenny Price of WLWT Midwestern Hayride and Major League Baseball Player Jim Viox of the Pittsburgh Pirates.

References

External links
 
 

Cemeteries in Kentucky
Buildings and structures in Kenton County, Kentucky